Eduard Artyomovich Markarov (born on 20 June 1942) is a retired Soviet football player who played striker for clubs Torpedo Armavir, Neftchi Baku and Ararat Yerevan and for the Soviet Union national football team and current football manager for Armenian Premier League club Mika Yerevan.

He was a member of the Ararat Yerevan team that won the Soviet Top League in 1973 and the Soviet Cup in 1973 and 1975. Markarov scored 5 goals for Ararat Yerevan at the 1974–75 European Cup, sharing top goalscorer with Gerd Müller of Bayern Munich. He played three matches for the Soviet national squad and participated with the team at the 1966 FIFA World Cup, where they came in fourth place. As a manager, Markarov led Mika Yerevan to victory at the Armenian Cup in 2000 and 2001. Markarov was awarded the Master of Sport of the USSR title in 1963, the Honored Master of Sport of the USSR title in 1973 and the Honored Coach of the Armenian SSR title in 1983.

Early life
Eduard Markarov was born in Baku, Azerbaijan SSR to a family of Armenians in Azerbaijan. Their family name is the Russified version of Margaryan. Markarov is ethnically Armenian. His father was Master of Sport of the USSR football player Artyom Markarov. Following in the footsteps of his father, Eduard took an interest in football and often played the sport with his brothers in their family yard. His father became his first coach. At age 14, he began to train in the youth club of Lokomotiv Baku.

Club career
Markarov was personally invited by head coach Boris Arkadyev to play for his club Neftchi Baku in 1961. In the same year, Markarov was invited to the Soviet Union national under-20 football team. His forward partners in the club were Yuri Kuznetsov, Alakbar Mammadov, Adamas Golodets and Anatoliy Banishevskiy, whom all made up the main strikers of Neftchi. Despite the teamwork of the players, the national team rarely invited them, and even when they were invited, they almost never played together.

In 1971, Markarov moved to Ararat Yerevan. He had been receiving several injuries throughout the late 1960s, resulting in a change of clubs. Markarov had the most successful period of his career with this team. Ararat Yerevan won the 1973 Soviet Top League and the Soviet Cup in 1973 and 1975. These achievements are considered among the greatest milestones in the history of Armenian football to this day. Markarov played as one of the main strikers of Ararat during these years. In 1974, along with Gerd Muller was the top scorer of the European Cup.

In the 1974–75 European Cup, Markarov scored both goals in the 2-0 first victory over Viking and three of the goals in the 4-2 second victory. Ararat Yerevan advanced to the quarterfinals, where the team played two games against Bayern Munich, losing the first 0-2 and winning the second 1–0. Bayern moved on due to aggregate and went on to win the European Cup. Markarov's five goals tied him with Gerd Müller as the top goalscorer of the European Cup.

International career
Markarov played for the Soviet Union national under-20 football team from 1961 to 1962. He played three matches for the Soviet Union national football team and was a member of the Soviet national squad that competed at the 1966 FIFA World Cup. The national team came in fourth place.

Managerial career
His managing career started suddenly in 1976, hardly a year after he retired as a football player. Head coach Victor Maslov left Ararat Yerevan and Markarov, having more respect in the team, was asked to become the head coach. He accepted, officially becoming a football manager at 33 years of age. Markarov led Ararat to the 1976 Soviet Top League spring finals. Ararat Yerevan also made it to the 1976 Soviet Cup under Markarov's guidance. After the successful debut season, Markarov left the team to begin training children at the National Football School of the Armenian SSR. In 1979, he went to Algeria to teach at the Institute of Science and Sports. On his return, he joined the Ararat Yerevan coaching staff again for the 1984–85 season, as an assistant to Nikita Simonyan, who also coached Ararat when Markarov played for the team. He was an assistant coach for the Soviet Union national under-21 football team from 1986 until the collapse of the Soviet Union in 1991. The youth team won the 1990 UEFA European Under-21 Football Championship and came in third place in the 1991 FIFA World Youth Championship during Markarov's time on the staff. Markarov then went back to working with Armenian teams of the now independent Armenia. Markarov managed Malatia Yerevan for the first ever Armenian Premier League in 1992 and became the first ever manager of the Armenia national football team, leading the team from 1992 to 1994. He managed Erebuni Yerevan for the 1995–96 season. From 1995 to 1999, Markarov worked in Lebanon with the Lebanese Armenian club Homenmen Beirut, which won the Lebanese Elite Cup in 1999. Markarov was the manager of Mika Yerevan from 2000 to 2001, during which time they won the Armenian Cup in both 2000 and 2001. For the 2008 season, he worked as the head coach of Kilikia Yerevan [1]. Markarov improved the team results, but they did not rise up from last place. At the end of the year, Makarov voluntarily resigned and moved to the position of trainer-breeder of the club from 2008 to 2010. As of 2010, Markarov is the Vice-president of coaching issues and director of the football school of club Mika Yerevan. Following the leave of head coach of Mika Armen Shahgeldyan from his position, it had been proposed that Markarov would fill the vacancy. Markarov worked as the acting head coach of Mika Yerevan from June to July 2011.

Style of play
Markarov was highly technical, inventive, skillfully carried out passing, had distinguished artistry and always represented a danger to the goalkeeper and accurate kicker.

Career statistics

Club

Honours

Club

Player
Ararat Yerevan
Soviet Top League: 1973
Soviet Top League runner-up: 1971
Soviet Cup: 1973, 1975

Manager
Ararat Yerevan
Soviet Top League runner-up: 1976 (spring)
Soviet Cup runner-up: 1976

Homenmen Beirut
Lebanese Elite Cup: 1999

Mika Yerevan
Armenian Cup: 2000, 2001

Country
Player
Soviet Union
FIFA World Cup (1): 1966 4th place

Manager
Soviet Union U-21
UEFA Euro U-21 (1): 1990
FIFA U-20 World Cup (1): 1991 3rd place

Individual
Grigory Fedotov club member - 159 goals
European Cup Top Goalscorer (1): 1974–75
Best 33 players of the Soviet Top League season: No. 2 - 1973; No. 3 - 1971, 1975
Honorary Citizen of the City of Fresno
Honorary Citizen of the City of Jerusalem
Order For Merit to the Fatherland

References

Bibliography

External links
 
Sportinfo.am 
Rusteam.permian.ru 
Ararathuptur.sitecity.ru 
Biograph.ru
Web archive of Statistics at Klisf.info

1942 births
Living people
Footballers from Baku
Azerbaijani people of Armenian descent
Honoured Masters of Sport of the USSR
Armenian footballers
Soviet footballers
Soviet Union international footballers
FC Ararat Yerevan players
1966 FIFA World Cup players
Armenian football managers
Armenia national football team managers
FC Ararat Yerevan managers
FC Mika managers
Expatriate footballers in Azerbaijan
Soviet football managers
Azerbaijani footballers
Soviet Top League players
Association football forwards
Neftçi PFK players
FC Armavir players
UEFA Champions League top scorers
Soviet Armenians